Sir Albert de Rutzen was chief magistrate of the Metropolitan Police Courts in the United Kingdom. He was knighted in 1901.

De Rutzen was stipendiary magistrate of Merthyr Tydfil in Wales from 1872 to 1876. He became a Metropolitan Police magistrate in London in 1876 to 1913, becoming Chief Magistrate in 1901, when he was knighted.

In 1910, de Rutzen issued the arrest warrant for Dr Crippen and his mistress Ethel Le Neve, for the murder of Crippen's wife. Crippen and Le Neve were on a ship to Canada were arrested on their arrival in Quebec. Crippen was convicted and executed and Le Neve was acquitted.

In 1872, de Rutzen married Horatia Augusta Stepney Gulston of Carmarthenshire. He died on 22 September 1913.

References

External links
 – photograph and biographical details of Lady Horatia de Rutzen

Year of birth missing
Year of death missing
20th-century English judges
Knights Bachelor
Stipendiary magistrates (England and Wales)
19th-century Welsh judges